Te Patukirikiri is a Māori iwi of the Hauraki area of New Zealand.

Radio station Nga Iwi FM broadcasts for Te Patukirikiri, Marutūahu from the iwi of Ngāti Tamaterā, Ngāti Rongoū, Ngāti Whanaunga, Ngāti Maru and Ngāti Pāoa, and other Hauraki residents from Ngāti Hako, Ngāti Huarere, Ngāti Hei, Ngāi Tai, Ngāti Pūkenga and Ngāti Rāhiri. It was set up Paeroa on 9 March 1990 to cover local events and promote Māori language. It expanded its reach to the Coromandel Peninsula, Hauraki Gulf and Huntly in mid-1991.

See also
Hauraki Māori
List of Māori iwi

References